David B. "Dave" Gassman is a Democratic member of the South Dakota House of Representatives, representing the 8th district since 2002.

External links
South Dakota Legislature – David Gassman official SD House website

Project Vote Smart – Representative David B. 'Dave' Gassman (SD) profile
Follow the Money – David B Gassman
2006 2004 2002 campaign contributions

Members of the South Dakota House of Representatives
1949 births
Living people